Turner & Hooch is a 1989 American buddy cop comedy film starring Tom Hanks and Beasley the Dog as the eponymous characters respectively. The film also co-stars Mare Winningham, Craig T. Nelson and Reginald VelJohnson. It was directed by Roger Spottiswoode and co-written by Daniel Petrie Jr., who also served as an executive producer.

Following the film's success, it spawned a franchise including a television movie sequel, and a legacy sequel television series.

Touchstone Pictures acquired the screenplay for Turner & Hooch for $1 million, which was the highest amount ever paid by Touchstone for any script at the time.

Plot

Scott Turner is a police investigator in Cypress Beach, California. Bored with the lack of serious crime with his current work, Turner is set to transfer to a much better position in Sacramento, leaving fellow investigator David Sutton to replace him. Turner shows David around in the three days left before his transfer, meeting with long time friend Amos Reed for a final time. The two investigators are then called to the discovery of $8,000 found at the local beach.

That same evening, Amos is murdered by an affiliate of local seafood magnate Walter Boyett when Amos reveals his suspicions of Boyett's operations. Turner is alerted to the crime the following morning, resulting in Scott taking in Hooch, Amos' pet Dogue de Bordeaux and the only witness to his murder. Scott immediately takes Hooch to the new town veterinarian Emily Carson. Scott pleads with Emily to take in Hooch as he has no experience of handling such an animal before. However, Emily insists that Hooch will be good for Scott, who lives alone.

Immediately returning home, Hooch's noisy, destructive nature clashes intensely with Scott's meticulous routine and lifestyle. Scott leaves Hooch alone one night to buy dog food, only to return to a home that has been completely ransacked by Hooch unintentionally. Furious, Scott kicks Hooch out, only for him to return later with Emily's female collie, Camille. Seeing an opportunity to jettison Hooch, Scott drives both Hooch and Camille back to the veterinary clinic, only to be caught by Emily as he leaves. Emily invites Scott inside, and the two proceed to continue painting the house that Emily earlier abandoned for the night. Scott leaves later on and, although he expresses his lack of interest in taking things further with Emily, it becomes clear that the two are starting to like each other.

Scott takes Hooch to the police precinct the next day, where a wedding occurs just across the street. Hooch recognizes the wedding photographer as Amos' killer and gives chase. The murderer is able to escape from his pursuers, but Scott is able to identify the killer as Zack Gregory, a former Marine with several prior arrests who also fits the profile of Amos' killing (Scott had earlier speculated that Amos' murderer must have had special experience in killing as the stab wound performed on Amos ensured total discretion). Scott also speculates that Amos was not murdered in a robbery attempt, but in order for Zack to cover up an illegal operation near to where he lived. This theory matches with Amos' regular complaints to Scott about the noises he heard going on at Boyett Seafood, the company that has Zack registered as an employee.

Celebrating the approval to search Boyett Seafood, Scott treats Hooch but notices his refusal to eat. Scott considers this a consequence of Amos' death, the long-term owner and presumably, only companion to Hooch. Scott and Hooch start to establish a closer bond. The next day, the police search Boyett Seafood, but find no evidence of any illegal activity. With his transfer pending the following day, Scott is relieved of responsibility for the case, which is given to David by Police Chief Howard Hyde.

Frustrated with reaching a dead end in the case, Scott meets with Emily, leading the two to spend the night together. In a eureka moment, Scott finally realizes why the earlier search of Boyett Seafood turned up nothing—instead of searching for imports, Boyett Seafood was actually exporting goods. Armed with this new lead, Scott takes Hooch back to the factory to stake-out. The following morning, David arrives upon Scott's request with the earlier recovered $8,000 from the beach. On a hunch, Scott commands Hooch to trace the scent of the money to anything he can find within the factory, ultimately returning with the exact type of bag the wad was discovered in.

Scott travels to the Lazy Acres Motel, the false address at which Zack Gregory was listed as a tenant. Scott interrogates the Motel owner into revealing where Zack is, only to be held up at gunpoint by him moments later. Zack orders Scott into his car to drive away, but Scott crashes the Cadillac into a concrete barrier, propelling Zack through the windshield and pinning him down by the neck, while assistance is provided by Hooch. Scott interrogates Zack, who reveals that he killed Amos, and also reveals that Walter Boyett is in on the illegal money trade going on at his factory, but is not in charge of it, to Scott's surprise.

Scott returns with Hooch to the factory and is unexpectedly joined by Chief Hyde. Already suspicious of Zack's earlier confession, Scott confronts Hyde, believing him to be in charge of the money laundering operation at the docks, using the gigantic ice cubes to hide the cash being sent out of the country. A gunfight soon occurs between Scott on the one hand and Hyde and Boyett on the other. Hooch is able to ambush Boyett from above, although Boyett shoots Hooch in the process.

Confronting Hyde, Scott is seemingly coerced by the corrupt Police Chief to frame Boyett, who is subsequently killed by Hyde. However, Hyde knows that Scott is an entirely honest police officer, and calls his bluff. A mortally wounded Hooch manages to get up, and briefly distract Hyde long enough for Scott to kill him.

Scott races to Emily's clinic to tend to Hooch, who has suffered severe blood loss, and eventually dies. Later, Turner is made police chief while Sutton becomes the leading investigator. Turner also marries Emily, with the couple now caring for Camille and her litter of puppies, one of whom looks and acts exactly like Hooch.

Cast

Production
Hooch's real name was Beasley, and he was a Dogue de Bordeaux (French mastiff). He had a stunt double named Igor, and Animal Makers created an exact replica of Hooch for the death scene. Beasley was born in a dog kennel in Merrimac, Wisconsin, owned by Peter Curley. Beasley was later purchased along with three other dogs for production of the film. The dogs were trained by Clint Rowe, who makes a brief appearance in the film as an American Society for the Prevention of Cruelty to Animals officer. Beasley died in 1992, aged 14.

It was rumored for years — and confirmed by their friend, actor and director Ron Howard in 2020 — that Henry Winkler, the original director, and Hanks had a falling-out on the set which led to Winkler's replacement by Spottiswoode. According to Winkler, he was fired thirteen days into the production by studio executive Jeffrey Katzenberg. Winkler said of his firing: "Let's just say I got along better with Hooch than I did with Turner."

Many scenes were filmed on location in Monterey, Pacific Grove, and Moss Landing, California. "Cypress Beach" is fictional, using mostly Pacific Grove for shots such as the police department, the wedding foot chase, and the car chase down Ocean View Ave.

Reception and legacy

Turner & Hooch gained a mixed response from critics, with a 52% rating on Rotten Tomatoes based on 29 reviews. The critical consensus reads: "Tom Hanks makes Turner and Hooch more entertaining than it might look on paper, but ultimately, this is still a deeply silly comedy about a cop and a canine". Despite this, the film was still a box office success. No plans were made for a sequel despite its revived popularity following Hanks' rise to success.

NBC did a television pilot based on the film in 1990. It aired in the summer with another dog pilot, "Poochinski" under the banner, "Two Dog Night".

Turner & Hooch has been referred to in various films and television shows, including the NBC/ABC medical sitcom Scrubs, in which main characters J.D. and Turk modify shift schedules so that Doctors Turner and Hooch are teamed up as a surgical team in the episode "My Faith in Humanity" (Doctor Turner was played by Jim Hanks, Tom Hanks' brother). They actually make a good team, and are disappointed when they have to disband. Another episode has Turk offended at JD's assumption that Turner and Hooch was an interracial buddy movie, an assumption made based on the aforementioned Hooch. In the second season of Castle, Beckett and Castle compare themselves to Turner and Hooch, with Castle being Hooch. This comparison returned in the Castle season 7 episode "Kill Switch".

During an appearance on Late Night with Conan O'Brien, O'Brien gave Tom Hanks a preserved dog skeleton, claiming it was his old friend Hooch. As one of O'Brien's first guests on The Tonight Show, Hanks improvised a song from an alleged Turner & Hooch stage musical. During the 2006 Academy Awards, Tom Hanks played in a sketch about acceptance speeches that ran on too long. In his comedic lengthy speech, he thanked Hooch.

The 2014 Tamil film Naaigal Jaakirathai is based on this film.

Lawsuit
In April 2015, actor Richard Dreyfuss and Christine Turner Wagner, widow of Turner & Hooch producer Raymond Wagner, sued The Walt Disney Company over profits from Turner & Hooch and What About Bob? (1991), a Touchstone release Dreyfuss had starred in. They accused Disney of refusing to allow a firm specializing in profit participation to audit the returns from the movies. Dreyfuss withdrew his claim a day later. Disney eventually allowed the audit to proceed. The auditors determined that Disney had made a profit of $32 million and that Wagner had been denied her share. Disney settled with Wagner in June 2018; the terms of the settlement were not disclosed.

Legacy

Sequel
A pilot episode for a Turner & Hooch spin-off/follow-up television series starring Thomas F. Wilson and Beasley the Dog, was produced. Though the show was not ordered to series, the pilot was released as a television film and debuted as a part of The Magical World of Disney. The movie was poorly received, but retroactively changed the ending of the film.

Television series

A television series remake was announced in February 2020, to be greenlit for the streaming service Disney+. Matt Nix developed the series along with an order of 12 episodes. Josh Peck portrays the ambitious and buttoned-up U.S. Marshal Scott Turner who inherits a big unruly dog coming to realise that the pet he did not want may be the partner he needs. In the same month Lyndsy Fonseca and Carra Patterson joined the cast as Laura, Scott's sister, and Jessica, Scott's partner, respectively. On March 6, Vanessa Lengies joined the cast as Erica, the chief trainer of the K-9 facility. The Disney+ series premiered on July 21, 2021.

References

External links

 
 
 
 
 

1989 comedy films
1989 films
1980s buddy comedy films
1980s buddy cop films
1980s crime comedy films
1980s police comedy films
American buddy comedy films
American buddy cop films
American crime comedy films
American police detective films
1980s English-language films
Fictional film duos
Fictional police officers in films
Films about dogs
Films about pets
Films about murder
Films directed by Roger Spottiswoode
Films set in Los Angeles
Films shot in California
Films with screenplays by Daniel Petrie Jr.
Touchstone Pictures films
Turner & Hooch (franchise)
1980s American films